Yuanhai Ziping is the first comprehensive and systematic book on the theory of Four Pillars of Destiny. The book was compiled by Xu Dasheng (徐大升, aka Xu Ziping :zh:徐子平, hence the book's name) of the Song Dynasty of China. It is a recording of various Zi Ping's fortune-telling methods. The method involves manipulation of the Four Pillars, each consisting of the two Chinese characters for the date and time of a person's birth (alternative name "eight characters" 八字 Ba Zi). 

The names of the book's chapters are:
Basics
Ten Gods
Symbolic stars
Six Types of Family Members
Fortunes of Females
Fortune-telling Verses

See also

References 

 
"Yuan hai zi ping" by Xu Zi Ping, Xi An: Shan Xi Lu You Chu Ban She, 2007. 
"Introduction to Zi Ping" by Jack Sweeney, Wen Bo Chu Ban She, 2009.

External links
 Chinese classic books on fortune telling
 Four Pillars of Destiny
 [www.phoenixanddragonfengshui.com/index.asp] Qi Men Dun Jia website of Jack Sweeney

Chinese classic texts
Chinese books of divination
Chinese culture
Taoist divination